Langwarrin was a railway station on the Stony Point line, in Victoria, Australia. It opened in 1888, to serve the newly established Langwarrin Military Reserve. The station operated until 1981, and was closed at the same time as the section of the Stony Point line, between the Long Island Junction and Stony Point railway station. Although the line reopened in 1983, Langwarrin station remained closed. Most traces of the station were removed by 1988, and all that remains of the station is the platform mound, located just off McClelland Drive, in between Tea-Tree Track and the Centre Break track, in the Langwarrin Flora and Fauna Reserve.

Public Transport Victoria announced in 2014 that it was investigating the possibility of reinstating a station at Langwarrin, and sought community feedback on three possible station sites, one of which is the location of the former 1888-1981 station.

In 2018, the federal government announced $228 million towards electrifying and duplicating the line between Frankston-Baxter, a project which would incorporate extending metro rail from Frankston to Langwarrin, building a new Langwarrin railway station, and building associated park-and-ride for 1000+ cars just off Peninsula Link and next to the station.

References

Disused railway stations in Melbourne
Railway stations in Australia opened in 1888
Railway stations closed in 1981